Giro della Valle d'Aosta is a stage race road bicycle race held annually in August in Aosta Valley, Italy. Since 2005, the race is organized as a 2.2 event on the UCI Europe Tour. Since 2012, the race takes place in July.

Winners

References

External links
 

UCI Europe Tour races
Recurring sporting events established in 1962
1962 establishments in Italy
Cycle races in Italy
Sport in Aosta Valley